Protein enabled homolog is a protein that in humans is encoded by the ENAH gene.

Interactions 

ENAH has been shown to interact with ABI1, ZYX, and PCARE.

References

Further reading 

 
 
 
 
 
 
 
 
 
 
 
 
 
 
 
 
 

EVH1 domain